Leasure is a surname. Notable people with the surname include:

 Althea Leasure (1953–1987), American magazine publisher
 Daniel Leasure (1819–1886), American soldier and physician
 Jack Leasure (born 1986), American basketball player
 William Leasure (born 1946), American contract killer

See also
 Leisure